Dehnow is a village in Dezh Gah Rural District, Dehram District, Farashband County, Fars Province, Iran. At the 2006 census, its population was 393, in 76 families.

References 

Populated places in Farashband County